Major-General Frederick Hammersley,  (21 October 1858 – 28 March 1924) was a senior British Army officer.

Military career
Hammersley was the son of Major-General Frederick Hammersley (1824–1902) and Sarah Mary Ann Keating (1826–1922). He joined the army and was commissioned a lieutenant in the Lancashire Fusiliers on 11 September 1876. He first saw service in the Nile Expedition of 1884–85 in the Sudan, was promoted to captain on 2 February 1885, received the brevet rank of major on 15 June 1885, and was confirmed in this rank on 9 September 1897. He fought at the Battle of Khartoum in 1898, and was present during the occupation of Crete later the same year, before being deployed to South Africa in 1899 to fight in the Second Boer War. He held a staff appointment as Deputy Assistant Adjutant General in Natal, and on 20 October 1899 was severely wounded at the Battle of Talana Hill. He was promoted to lieutenant-colonel on 3 February 1900, and at the same time appointed in command of the 4th battalion of his regiment, stationed at Chatham, which he commanded in South Africa.

Between 1906 and 1911, Hammersley commanded the 3rd Brigade, Aldershot Command, but was relieved of his position due to repeatedly showing signs of shell shock. Instead he was given command of Northumbrian Division in September 1911. Despite his shell shock, upon the outbreak of the First World War, he was put in command of West Lancashire Division in August 1914 and shortly thereafter of the newly formed 11th (Northern) Division, part of Kitchener's volunteer army. In this capacity, Hammersley commanded the Landing at Suvla Bay by his division during the Gallipoli Campaign. However, his ability to oversee such an operation was subsequently called into question, and the Dardanelles Commission openly criticised his command. The orders given by General Hammersley were deemed to be confused and the work of his staff defective. On 23 August 1915, he was removed from the front-line in a state of collapse and was replaced by Major-General Edward Fanshawe. He was invalided back to England, suffering from battle fatigue. Lord Kitchener had warned that he should be watched to ensure that "the strain of trench warfare is not too much for him".

He was made a Companion of the Order of the Bath (CB) in the 1908 Birthday Honours.

Hammersley married Edith Grant, and together they had two daughters.

References

|-

|-
 

|-

1858 births
1924 deaths
British Army major generals
Lancashire Fusiliers officers
British Army generals of World War I
British Army personnel of the Second Boer War
Companions of the Order of the Bath
British Army personnel of the Mahdist War
British military personnel of the 1898 Occupation of Crete